Olyshivka is an urban-type settlement in Chernihiv Raion, Chernihiv Oblast, Ukraine. It hosts the administration of Olyshivka settlement hromada, one of the hromadas of Ukraine. Population:

Economy

Transportation
Olyshivka has access to the Highway M01, connecting Chernihiv and Kyiv. In the other direction, the road connects Olyshivka with Kulykivka.

People from Olyshivka 
 Vitaliy Masol (1928–2018), Soviet-Ukrainian politician, Head of the Council of Ministers 1987–1990, Prime Minister 1994–1995

References

Kozeletsky Uyezd
Urban-type settlements in Chernihiv Raion